Radmila Beresneva (born ) is a Kazakhstani volleyball player. She is a member of the Kazakhstan women's national volleyball team and played for Irtysh Kazchrome in 2014. 

She was part of the Kazakhstani national team at the 2014 FIVB Volleyball Women's World Championship in Italy.
She participated in the 2016 FIVB Volleyball World Grand Prix.

Clubs
  Irtysh Kazchrome (2014)

References

External links
http://worldoqt.japan.2016.women.fivb.com/en/teams/kaz-kazakhstan/players/radmila-beresneva?id=50252
http://astanatimes.com/2016/06/kazakhstan-narrowly-misses-promotion-in-womens-volleyball-world-grand-prix/
http://www.todor66.com/volleyball/Olympics/Women_OQ_2016.html

1983 births
Living people
Kazakhstani women's volleyball players
Place of birth missing (living people)
Volleyball players at the 2018 Asian Games
Asian Games competitors for Kazakhstan
21st-century Kazakhstani women